Liisa Marja Hyssälä (born 18 December 1948 in Ii) is a retired Finnish politician of the Centre Party.  She was a member of the Parliament of Finland from 1995 to 2010 and the minister of social affairs and health from 2003 to 2010. She was the General Director of Kela from 2010 to 2016.

References 

1948 births
Living people
People from Ii
Centre Party (Finland) politicians
Ministers of Social Affairs of Finland
Members of the Parliament of Finland (1995–99)
Members of the Parliament of Finland (1999–2003)
Members of the Parliament of Finland (2003–07)
Members of the Parliament of Finland (2007–11)
Finnish dentists
Women government ministers of Finland
21st-century Finnish women politicians